The Somnox Sleep Robot is a sleep device that claims to enhance quality of sleep. It's a soft-robotic that enhances the quality of sleep and uses breathing regulation and audio to help fall asleep faster, get deeper sleep, and wake up at the optimal time through a smart alarm.

Software 
The Somnox Sleep Robot has no internal display. It can be controlled with a smartphone running either Android or iOS on the companion app, "Somnox Companion".

Somnox 2 

In November 2021, Somnox launched their second product; Somnox 2 Breathe and Sleep Robot. It has similar functions to the first model that appeared in 2019, but has many improvements. For example, the new version has WiFi, Bluetooth, and, according to the manufacturers, the spirometry algorithm has been improved, so that the robot works in almost all sleeping modes. The companion app has also been completely revamped and the sleep robot is smaller, lighter and sleeker than its predecessor. The built-in speaker has also been improved.

See also 
 Sleep disorder
 Sleep hygiene
 Sleep study
 Sundowning
 White noise machine

References 

Medical robots
Sleep medicine
Robots of the Netherlands